Mountain Heights Academy is a non-profit online charter high school in the United States. It received its charter in 2007 and opened in 2010 as Open High School of Utah. In January 2013, the school was renamed Mountain Heights Academy.

History
Open High School of Utah was founded by David A. Wiley in 2007.

Teaching Model
Open High School of Utah existed as a virtual high school, with students attending online. Teachers curated Open Educational Resources aligned to the content to Utah state standards.

Open Educational Aspects
Creating Open Educational Resources was a fundamental aspect of the school's charter. On 7 September 2010, Open High School of Utah released ten semesters of high school curriculum under a CC-BY license.

References

External links
 Mountain Heights Academy home page

Charter schools in Utah
Public high schools in Utah
Online schools in the United States